Davis Riley (born December 17, 1996) is an American professional golfer who plays on the PGA Tour.

Amateur career
Riley was born in Hattiesburg, Mississippi. He attended Presbyterian Christian School in Hattiesburg, winning the Mississippi state title four straight years. In 2015, he was named All-USA Boys Golf Player of the Year by USA Today. Riley made the final of the U.S. Junior Amateur two years in a row, joining Tiger Woods and Jordan Spieth as the only players to appear in the championship match twice. In 2013, he lost the final to Scottie Scheffler when he called a penalty on himself on the last hole. He was a member of the American team at the 2014 Junior Ryder Cup that defeated the European team 16–8 in Perthshire, Scotland.

Riley enrolled at Alabama in 2015. He was a Second Team All-SEC as a sophomore and was ranked as the best collegiate player in the country entering his junior year. He played in the Palmer Cup in 2018, compiling a 2–2 record in the American win over the International team.

Riley turned professional in 2019.

Professional career
Riley joined the Korn Ferry Tour in 2020, earning his first win at the Panama Championship in February. He added a second title at the TPC San Antonio Championship in July, finishing the combined 2020-21 Korn Ferry Tour season ninth on the points list to earn his PGA Tour card. While playing the Korn Ferry Tour, Riley was roommates with Will Zalatoris, who defeated him in the U.S. Junior Amateur final in 2014.

In March 2022, Riley took a two-shot lead into the final round of the Valspar Championship before losing on the second playoff hole to Sam Burns. He finished fourth in the Zurich Classic of New Orleans while partnering with Zalatoris. The following week, he finished in 5th place at the Mexico Open.

Riley has qualified for the U.S. Open twice, missing the cut in both 2015 and 2020.

Professional wins (2)

Korn Ferry Tour wins (2)

Playoff record
PGA Tour playoff record (0–1)

Results in major championships
Results not in chronological order before 2020.

CUT = missed the half-way cut
"T" = tied
NT = No tournament due to COVID-19 pandemic

Results in The Players Championship

CUT = missed the halfway cut

U.S. national team appearances
Amateur
Junior Ryder Cup: 2014 (won)
Palmer Cup: 2018 (won)

References

External links

American male golfers
PGA Tour golfers
Korn Ferry Tour graduates
Alabama Crimson Tide men's golfers
Golfers from Mississippi
Sportspeople from Hattiesburg, Mississippi
1996 births
Living people